Eos, Transactions, American Geophysical Union, is a weekly magazine of Earth science published by John Wiley & Sons for the American Geophysical Union (AGU). The magazine, based in Washington, DC, publishes news, book reviews, AGU journal and meeting abstracts, meeting programs and reports, a comprehensive meetings calendar, and announcements of grants, fellowships, and employment opportunities, as well as peer-reviewed articles on current research and on the relationship of geoscience to social and political questions. Since 2015 it is published in magazine form and is available electronically. A hardcover edition of Eos is published once each year and contains the articles, news, and editorials from the tabloid issues. Eos accepts both display and classified advertising.

History 
Transactions of the American Geophysical Union began publication as proceedings of the organization's meetings. In 1920, the first volume was reprinted from volume 6, number 10 of the Proceedings of the National Academy of Sciences as National Research Council Reprint and Circular Series, number 11, and appeared under the title Scientific papers presented before the American Geophysical Union. It compiled papers from the AGU's second annual meeting. AGU's fourth and sixth through ninth annual meetings were also published as bulletins of the National Research Council. The third and fifth annual meetings were devoted to discussion and no scientific papers presented. These transactions were not printed but were mimeographed for limited distribution only.

The current name of the publication is taken from Eos, the Greek goddess of dawn, representing for AGU the new light continually being shed by basic geophysical research on the understanding of Earth and its environment in space. The name was added in 1969.

Abstracting and indexing
Eos is indexed by GeoRef, GEOBASE, Scopus, PubMed, and several other databases. It is a GeoRef priority journal.

References

External links
 Official website - eos.org 

1920 establishments in the United States
American Geophysical Union academic journals
Wiley (publisher)
Magazines established in 1920
Magazines published in Washington, D.C.
Professional and trade magazines
Science and technology magazines published in the United States
Weekly magazines published in the United States